Presidential elections were held in Gabon on 30 December 1979, the first time they had been held separately from National Assembly elections. The country was a one-party state at the time, with the Gabonese Democratic Party as the sole legal party. GDP leader and incumbent president Omar Bongo was the only candidate, and was re-elected unopposed.

Results

References

1979 in Gabon
Gabon
Presidential elections in Gabon
One-party elections
Single-candidate elections
December 1979 events in Africa